Iine or IINE may refer to:

 International Institute of New England, a non-profit organization
 "Iine!", a song by Babymetal on the 2012 single Babymetal / Kiba of Akiba
 Iine!, a 2013 album by Greeeen
 "#Iine!", a 2017 song by Tomomi Itano

See also 
 Line (disambiguation)
 Yine (disambiguation)